Éxitos is a 2000 greatest hits album by the Mexican pop singer Fey.

Track listings

U.S. version
 "Media Naranja"
 "Fiebre De Sabado"
 "Gatos En El Balcon"
 "Diselo Con Flores"
 "Canela"
 "El"
 "Me Enamoro De Ti"
 "Subidon"
 "Te Pertenezco"
 "Ni Tú Ni Nadie"
 "Azúcar amargo"
 "Bajo el Arcoiris"
 "La Noche Se Mueve"
 "Cielo Liquido"
 "Muévelo"

Mexican version
 "Media Naranja"
 "Azucar Amargo"
 "Diselo Con Flores"
 "Gatos En El Balcon"
 "Bajo El Arcoiris"
 "El"
 "Me Enamoro De Ti"
 "Subidon"
 "Te Pertenezco"
 "Ni Tu Ni Nadie"
 "Fiebre De Sabado"
 "Canela"
 "La Noche Se Mueve"
 "Cielo Liquido"
 "Muévelo"
 "Mega Mix" (Gatos En El Balcon/Ni Tu Ni Nadie/La Noche Se Mueve/Azucar Amargo/Media Naranja/Me Enamoro De Ti/Muévelo)

Fey (singer) compilation albums
2000 greatest hits albums